Up Up Up Up Up Up is the ninth album by singer-songwriter Ani DiFranco, released in 1999 on Righteous Babe Records (see 1999 in music).

"Angry Anymore" was released to radio, but did not chart.  Its promotional single featured a radio remix and an extended mix; the banjo intro to the track was sampled for a later DiFranco track, "The Arrivals Gate", released on To the Teeth.

"Jukebox" was nominated for a Grammy Award in the category of Female Rock Vocal Performance.

Track listing
All songs written by Ani DiFranco.

 "'Tis of Thee" – 4:42
 "Virtue" – 5:07
 "Come Away from It" – 8:22
 "Jukebox" – 4:27
 "Angel Food" – 5:45
 "Angry Anymore" – 3:27
 "Everest" – 5:15
 "Up Up Up Up Up Up" – 3:21
 "Know Now Then" – 4:38
 "Trickle Down" – 3:51
 "Hat Shaped Hat" – 12:55

Personnel 
 Ani DiFranco – acoustic guitar, piano, accordion, electric guitar, vocals, space phone
 Goat – drum machine
 Jason Mercer – banjo, bass, vocals, upright bass
 Andy Stochansky – drums, vocals, pocket cajun
 Julie Wolf – organ, piano, accordion, vocals, clavinet, Wurlitzer

Technical
Ani DiFranco – record producer
Andrew Gilchrist – engineer, mixing
Ethan Allen –  assistant engineer
Scott Hull – mastering
Scot Fisher – photography

Charts

References

Ani DiFranco albums
1999 albums
Righteous Babe Records albums